Xixi Campus (Traditional Chinese: 西溪校區, Simplified Chinese: 西溪校区), is an urban campus of Zhejiang University in Hangzhou.

Introduction
It was the campus of Hangzhou University, until it was merged into Zhejiang University in 1998. Because previous Hangzhou University mainly paid attention on sciences, humanities and teacher training, so the campus remains their corresponding rich facilities.

It located in the urban Hangzhou City, Zhejiang Province, and also in the newly founded Hangzhou Hi-tech Development Zone (杭州高新技術開發區 / 杭州高新技术开发区). It's close to the Xixi River (西溪), so named after it.

The campus has a total area of 684 mu, and a total building area of half million m2. Its main library has a collection volume of about two million books and 12000 different kinds of journals/magazines . It holds the TOEFL test site of Zhejiang Province in China.

Institutions 

 Faculty of Science:
 Department of Psychology and Behavioral Sciences

 Faculty of Arts and Humanities: 
 School of Art and Archaeology
 Center for Balance Architecture
 Zhejiang University Archives
 Zhejiang University Press
 Zhejiang Education Development Academy

References

Places of Zhejiang University